Jourdan Julian Lewis (born August 31, 1995) is an American football cornerback for the Dallas Cowboys of the National Football League (NFL). He played college football at Michigan, where he was named First-team All-American and First-team All-Big Ten in 2015 and 2016. Lewis was drafted by the Cowboys in the third round of the 2017 NFL Draft.

Early years
Lewis was raised in Detroit, where he attended and played high school football at Cass Technical High School. As a junior, he tallied eight interceptions and 11 touchdowns. As a senior, he had 751 receiving yards, six touchdowns and 742 return yards with three touchdowns on special teams.

He and Lano Hill anchored the Cass Technical defensive backfield that won  back-to-back (2011 and 2012) Michigan High School Athletic Association Division 1 championships for coach Thomas Wilcher.

College career
Lewis accepted a football scholarship from the University of Michigan. As a freshman he appeared in 13 games, registering 17 tackles and two passes defensed.

As a sophomore, he appeared in 12 games (seven starts), collecting 39 tackles, 28 solo tackles, 1.5 tackles for loss, two interceptions and six passes defensed. He was named a starter in the third game of the season.

As a junior, he started 13 games, posting 52 tackles (3.5 for loss), two interceptions and 20 passes defensed (ranked third in the FBS). He also averaged 25.2 yards on kickoff returns.

As a senior, he missed the first 3 games with injuries to his back, hamstring and quad. Through the first 10 games of the 2015 season, Lewis had 20 pass breakups, which set a new school record. He ranked second among all players in the NCAA Division I FBS with 21 passes defended. Lewis set a single-season school record with 21 pass breakups in 2015, surpassing the previous record of 18 held by Marlin Jackson (2002) and Leon Hall (2006). Following the 2015 season, Lewis was named to the All-Big Ten defensive first-team, by both the media and coaches. He was also named a First-team All-American by USA Today, and Sports Illustrated, becoming the first Wolverine to earn the honor since Taylor Lewan in 2013, and the first Wolverine defensive back to earn the honor since Leon Hall in 2006.

During the 2016 season, Lewis was targeted 31 times, allowing 74 yards, with 14 total yards after catch and 0.36 yards per snap in coverage. Lewis has contributed 23 tackles, 3.5 tackles-for-loss, two interceptions and 12 pass breakups this season. Following the 2016 season, Lewis was named the Tatum–Woodson Defensive Back of the Year, and was once again named to the All-Big Ten defensive first-team, by both the media and coaches. He was also named a first-team All-American by the Walter Camp Football Foundation, Associated Press, Sporting News, and Sports Illustrated.

Professional career

On January 10, 2017, it was reported that Lewis and teammates Chris Wormley and Ben Gedeon had all accepted their invitations to attend the 2017 Senior Bowl. On January 28, 2017, he recorded four combined tackles and displayed impressive coverage under Chicago Bears' head coach John Fox as a part of the North team who lost 16-15 to the South. As a top ten cornerback prospect, Lewis was invited to the NFL combine. He attended and performed the majority of drills, but opted to skip the short shuttle and three-cone drill. On March 18, he opted to participate at Michigan's Pro Day. Lewis chose to run his 40-yard dash (4.47), 20-yard dash (2.51), 10-yard dash (1.59), short shuttle (4.38), and three-cone drill (6.88) for representatives and scouts from all 32 NFL teams. Lewis' draft projections varied from as high as the second or third round to as low as the sixth or seventh round, mainly due to misdemeanor charges (of which he was later acquitted). He was ranked the sixth cornerback in the draft by NFL analyst Mel Kiper Jr. and the tenth best cornerback prospect in the draft by NFLDraftScout.com.

2017

Lewis was selected by the Dallas Cowboys in the third round (92nd overall) of the 2017 NFL Draft. He was the 14th cornerback selected in 2017. On June 28, the Dallas Cowboys signed Lewis to a four-year, $3.24 million contract that includes a signing bonus of $753,428.

He was expected to compete with Orlando Scandrick, Chidobe Awuzie, Anthony Brown, and Nolan Carroll for a job as the starting cornerback, but suffered a hamstring injury during his first training camp practice and missed all of the preseason.

On September 17, Lewis made his professional regular season debut against the Denver Broncos after being a healthy scratch for their season-opener. He went into the game after Carroll suffered a concussion and he recorded six solo tackles and intercepted the first pass of his career off of Broncos' quarterback Trevor Siemian in a 42–17 loss. The next week, he earned his first career start in place of Carroll and recorded six solo tackles and deflected a pass  in a 28–17 win at the Arizona Cardinals. He suffered a hamstring injury during the game and was questionable going into the following week.

During a Week 5 matchup against the Green Bay Packers, he made his second career start and collected seven combined tackles and a season-high three pass deflections in the Cowboys' 35-31 loss. Lewis gave up an 11-yard game-winning touchdown with 11 seconds left in the game to Davante Adams on a back shoulder fade thrown by Aaron Rodgers. Lewis was criticized by FS1 analyst Skip Bayless who attributed the touchdown to the height difference between Adams (6'2") and Lewis (5'10"). On October 8, the Cowboys released Carroll, making Lewis the starting right cornerback due to his performances.

2018
Lewis finished the 2018 season with 12 combined tackles, one interception, one pass defensed, and two fumble recoveries in 15 games.

2019
In week 6 against the New York Jets, Lewis recorded an interception off Sam Darnold in the 24–22 loss.
In week 9 against the New York Giants, Lewis recovered a fumble forced by teammate Dorance Armstrong on Daniel Jones and returned it for a 63 yard touchdown in the 37–18 win.
In week 14 against the Chicago Bears on Thursday Night Football, Lewis recorded a toe tapping interception off a pass thrown by Mitch Trubisky at the one yard line during the 31–24 loss.

2020
In Week 15 against the San Francisco 49ers, Lewis recorded his first sack of the season on Nick Mullens during the 41–33 win.

2021
On March 17, 2021, Lewis signed a three-year contract extension with the Cowboys. Lewis accumulated career-highs with 3 interceptions, 61 total tackles and 88 interception yards.

2022
Lewis suffered a Lisfranc injury in Week 7 and was placed on injured reserve on October 26, 2022.

References

External links
Michigan Wolverines bio
Dallas Cowboys bio

1995 births
Living people
Cass Technical High School alumni
Players of American football from Detroit
All-American college football players
American football cornerbacks
Michigan Wolverines football players
Dallas Cowboys players